Crawford Bay may refer to:
Crawford Bay, British Columbia, a small community in southeast British Columbia, Canada
Crawford Bay (Western Australia), a small bay located in Western Australia